Hemibarbus mylodon is a species of freshwater cyprinid fish endemic to Korea. It is commonly called spotted barbel or Korean doty barbel. It inhabits the upper stream of Imjin, Han and Geum River. As of 2008, it is classified as endangered species.

H. mylodon is benthopelagic. It has 3–7 dorsal soft rays and 3–5 anal soft rays. The fish has a peculiarity of building a tower of pebbles and sand to protect its eggs.

Gallery

References

Hemibarbus
Fish of Korea
Endemic fauna of Korea
Taxa named by Lev Berg
Fish described in 1907